G'Five International Limited is a Chinese consumer electronics company headquartered in Shenzhen, Guangdong and registered in Hong Kong. Founded in 2003, the company specialises in manufacturing mobile phones, smartphones to emerging markets under G'Five brand.

In the second quarter of 2010, G'Five sold 5 million mobile handsets, becoming the tenth largest manufacturer of mobile phones worldwide.

Gfive's G Cloud

Gfive had launched 5 high-end smartphones under G Cloud range of internet technology. It will offer users up to 5.5 GB free cloud  space memory through which user can easily synchronise data to laptops etc. Even if user lost his/her mobile he/she can just transfer all the data by one touch on his new phone's G Cloud service.

Products

G’five current flagship phone  is  Gfive  President G10. It is a smartphone with a total of 5.7 inches full HD of display, and President G10 by G'FIVE is equipped  with a Quad-Core 1.7 GHz processor with 32 GB ROM, 1 GB RAM, and with the 13.0 MP back camera, 5.0 MP front-facing camera. Other smartphones  GFive produced are  President G12, G9, A97, President G6, G10 (Fashion), A5, A1 (Spark).

References

External links

 

Mobile phone companies of China
Telecommunication equipment companies of China
Manufacturing companies based in Shenzhen
Chinese companies established in 2003
Mobile phone manufacturers
Chinese brands